Shockwave, Darkside is a 2014 American 3D science fiction film written and directed by Jay Weisman.  It is produced by Favorit Films, Pipeline Entertainment and Red Giant Media. The UK Premiere occurred on August 22, 2014 at the London FrightFest Film Festival.

Plot 

The nano-plague that poisoned Earth's water supply has reached its 60-year critical mass. The Unlight enemy forced the first exodus to the moon where the outlawed banished population was supposed to die. But now the Unlights have launched from Earth and are amassing on the south-west sector of the darkside of the moon for a massive ice-mining operation.

It is the last Great War and lunar troops are sent into battle for the precious resource. However, one squad is shot down and the five surviving soldiers find themselves stranded. Cut off and behind enemy lines, they start a dangerous journey through snipers and minefields back to their extraction point with only 36 hours of oxygen left. As their numbers dwindle and nerves fray, they make an amazing discovery about the moon that just might save their lives.

Cast
Main cast:
Bill Sage as Dalton
Mei Melançon as The Machine
Sonequa Martin-Green as Private Lang
Rich Ceraulo as Corporal Kim
Alexander Cendese as Private Schorr

Other cast (in alphabetical order):
 Elwaldo Baptiste
 James Barrett
 Brianne Blessing
 Nedra Gallegos
 Gus Kelley
 C.R. Marchi
 Brian Morrison
 Joe Sobalo Jr.

Related
A prequel web-comic of the same name was published by Keenspot in 2011. Created and written by Jay Weisman. Pencil Artwork by Weilin Yang. Finishes by Youjun Yang. Colors by Kun Song. Letters & Edits by Benny R. Powell. The 3D aspect of the comic got mixed reviews.  Crabcake Confidential stated "either my eyes are broken, or the 3D thing isn't working for me."

Reviews
 Shockwave, Darkside (movie review)
 Frightfest 2014-Shockwave Darkside 3D Review
 Shockwave, Darkside review
 Shockwave, Darkside 3D
 FrightFest 2014 Day 2

References
http://www.postmagazine.com/Publications/Post-Magazine/2014/July-1-2014/Into-The-Void-completes-VFX-for-Shockwave-Darksi.aspx

External links
 
 
 List of 3D films

2014 films
2014 3D films
2010s English-language films